Rhodoglobus is a Gram-positive, non-spore-forming and aerobic genus of bacteria from the family Microbacteriaceae.

References

Microbacteriaceae
Bacteria genera